The Blue Elephant is a 2014 Egyptian drama/horror/mystery film produced and directed by Marwan Hamed in Cairo, Egypt. The story was originally translated into film from a 2012 Arabic novel written by the famous Egyptian writer Ahmed Mourad, and starring Egyptian actors Karim Abdel Aziz, Khaled El Sawy and Nelly Karim. The film talks about a man called Yehia, who unwillingly comes out of isolation after five years, to resume his service in El-Abbaseya psychiatric hospital, where he is in charge of evaluating the mental health of the criminally insane. It was followed by a sequel The Blue Elephant 2 (translit. Al Fil Al Azraq 2) released in 2019.

According to Ahmed Mourad, writer of the Arabic novel, the book and the film hold two different endings. Director Marwan Hamed proposed a change in the closing scene of the movie to allow the film to adapt and satisfy a large mass of audience.

The Blue Elephant received mixed reviews but performed well in the Egyptian Box-office during Eid time. The film did not follow the formula of the recent slew of Egyptian comedies, yet it managed to win over audiences across the Arab region. The film gained up to 30 million Egyptian pounds, which is approximately 4.2 million U.S. Dollars. As of 2021, it is the 5th highest rated horror film on IMDb with a rating of 8.2.

Plot

The movie is built around psychiatrist Dr. Yehia Rashed (Karim Abdel Aziz), who returns to his job 5 years after the death of his loving wife and daughter. Filled with grief for his loss, Yehia resorts himself to drugs, drinking and gambling. But then he receives a warning from work and returns to his duties in El-Abbaseya psychiatric hospital where he is assigned 8 Gharb, a special department for mental patients who are also criminals. There, a surprise awaits him that turns his life upside down. Yehia's return coincides with the arrival of a former old  psychiatrist friend, Sherif Al Kordy (Khaled El Sawy), a patient accused of brutally killing his wife. Hoping to find out the truth behind Sherif's case, Yehia begins a journey of locating clues, investigating the crime scene and gathering as much information from Sherif's younger sister Lobna (Nelly Karim), Yehia's first true love. While he tries to unravel the many mysteries surrounding his friend, Dr. Yehia gets sucked into a sea of hallucinations, magic spells, numbers and demons, swirling around a tattoo parlor and a blue pill that bears the print of a six-legged elephant. For Yehia, the secrets behind the pill The Blue Elephant helped him enter the gateway of another world to uncover the demonic sources behind Sherif's crime.

Cast
 Karim Abdel Aziz as Dr. Yehia Rashed
 Khaled El Sawy as Sherif Al Kordy also as Na'el 
 Nelly Karim as Lobna 
 Mohamed Mamdouh as Dr. Sameh 
 Dareen Haddad as Maya 
 Lebleba as Dr. Safaa
 Shereen Reda as Deega 
 Mohamed Shahin as Shaker
Yvesson as founder Blue Elephant

Credits and dates
Thanks to the support from: 
 Al Shorouk for Media Productions.
 Albatross Production Company.
 Lighthouse Films.
The movie was successfully produced. 
The three production companies also contributed with "Arabia Cinema Production & Distribution" to help distribute the movie worldwide. 
The Film The Blue Elephant, First got released on the 28th of July, 2014 in Egypt. A month later on Eid al-Fitr 14 August 2014 the movie was available for viewers in countries such as (United Arab Emirates, Kuwait and Bahrain)

Film festivals and awards
The 14th edition of the Marrakech International Film Festival - December 5 to 13, 2014
International Prize for Arabic Fiction - 10 February 2014

Marketing
The Film has been successfully distributed with the help of "Arabia Cinema Production & Distribution (ACPD)" in Egypt.

References

External links
 
The Blue Elephant (2014) (trailer)
  Official Facebook Page, The Blue Elephant (2014), March 26,2015
 Official Twitter Page, The Blue Elephant (2014), March 26,2015
IMDb, The Blue Elephant (2014), February 13, 2015
The National, The Blue Elephant, a box office success in Egypt, stomps into UAE, February 13, 2015
Egypt Independent, ‘Al-Feel al-Azraq’: Ahmed Mourad’s latest novel blends thriller and crime with pyschiatry, February 14, 2015

Egyptian drama films
Egyptian mystery films
Egyptian horror films
Films directed by Marwan Hamed
Films based on works by Ahmed Mourad
2014 films